The Nokia 3500 classic is a mobile phone handset, manufactured by Nokia and was released for sale in 2007. It has 5 colour styles (blue, red, pink, green and black).
Its features include a 2-megapixel camera, an MP3 player, applications, games, a recording option, and an Internet service where users can receive backgrounds, ringtones, and screen savers. The metal frame is designed to prevent scratches on both display and keypad.

References

External links 
 Nokia 3500 Classic (Nokia UK) 
 Nokia 3500 Classic Specifications (Nokia UK)

3500 classic
Mobile phones introduced in 2007
Mobile phones with user-replaceable battery